Flintstone Flyer is a  Corvette-powered 1949 Packard gasser of the 1960s, built and driven by Dave Koffel. It set one national claas record (in 1961) and won two class titles (1962 and 1963).

History
The car was a dark blue 1949 Packard, purchased for US$50 and built in Koffel's own garage. 

The engine was swapped for a  Chevrolet small-block V8 (from a 1961 Corvette bored  over)*wrong, inline-six engines were long gone from the corvette lineup by 1961; only had a 283CI V8 available*.  It was only mildly modified, fitted with 270 heads *also wrong, such heads do not exist. Closest # found are 3872708, which were not available until 1967* solid-lifter camshaft, and Offenhauser intake manifold (with three two-barrel {twin-choke} carburetors).

The transmission was a four-speed manual from a Corvette, and the rear axle came from a 1957 Plymouth with a steep 6.17:1 ratio (because of the car's high weight).

In 1961, Koffel changed the three deuces to Hilborn fuel injection.

In 1963, Koffel replaced the steel front end panels with custom fiberglass items produced by Walt Sari of Ashtabula, Ohio.

Notes

Needs further research. Quick Google search and short amount of research proves to be incorrect on details*

Sources
Davis, Larry. Gasser Wars, North Branch, MN:  Cartech, 2003, pp.180-8.

Packard vehicles
Rear-wheel-drive vehicles
1940s cars
1960s cars
Drag racing cars